Oreonectes retrodorsalis is a species of stone loach. This cavefish is found only in Guangxi in China. Some authorities places this species in the genus Yunnanilus rather than Oreonectes. The specific name is a compound of the Latin words  retro meaning back or past and dorsalis meaning "the back", referring to the placement of the dorsal fin closer to base of the caudal fin than to the tip of snout.

Oreonectes retrodorsalis grows to  standard length.

References

retrodorsalis
Freshwater fish of China
Endemic fauna of Guangxi
Cave fish
Fish described in 1995